Adam Seth Cifu is an American physician, academic, author and researcher. He is a Professor of Medicine and Director of Academic Programming, Bucksbaum Institute for Clinical Excellence at the University of Chicago.

Cifu has authored over 125 peer-reviewed publications on clinical practice, medical decision-making and medical reversal, and general internal medicine. He is the co-author of a textbook on clinical reasoning, Symptom to Diagnosis: An Evidence-Based Guide and a book about medical decision making for the lay audience, Ending Medical Reversal: Improving Outcomes, Saving Lives. He, together with Scott Stern, hosted the podcast S2D: The Symptom to Diagnosis Podcast and currently hosts The Clinical Excellence Podcast.

Education
Cifu attended the Dalton School in New York City. He then received his bachelor's degree with honors in Chemistry from Haverford College in 1989, and a Doctor of Medicine degree from Cornell University Medical College (now Weill Cornell Medicine) in 1993. He completed his internal medicine residency at the Beth Israel Hospital (now in Beth Israel Deaconess Medical Center) in 1996, and then served as the Primary Care Chief Resident.

Career
Cifu started his career as a Clinical Fellow at Harvard Medical School in 1993, and became an instructor in Medicine in 1996. He then joined the faculty of the University of Chicago as an Assistant Professor of Medicine in 1997. He was promoted to Associate Professor in 2005, and to Professor of Medicine in 2013.

Research
Cifu's research is primarily focused on the evidence base of clinical practice.

Medical reversal
A medical reversal occurs when a robust clinical trial produces results that contradict existing clinical practice and the older, less methodologically sound, trials on which it is based. The term was coined in 2011 in an article by Vinay Prasad, Victor Gall and Adam Cifu published in the Archives of Internal Medicine (now JAMA Internal Medicine).

Cifu and Prasad have published extensively on the topic. In one large study, Prasad, Cifu and collaborators reviewed all of the original research articles published in the New England Journal of Medicine between 2001 and 2010. They identified 146 common medical practices that offered no net benefits. He also focused low-value practices and patterns of medical research, and found out that reversal of established medical practice occurs across all classes of medical practice. In his paper published in 2012, he discussed the reversals in terms of established medical practices, and suggested that the established standards must be abandoned if they are not beneficial enough.

Cifu and Prasad brought together much of their research on Medical Reversal in a book entitled Ending Medical Reversal: Improving Outcomes, Saving Lives. Abigail Zuger reviewed the book in the New York Times writing that the book concerns itself with "how often modern medicine reverses itself, analyzing why it happens, and suggesting ways to make it stop."

Medical education
Cifu has spent many years teaching clinical medicine and evidence-based medicine at the University of Chicago. He has directed the courses Medical Evidence and Critical Appraisal of the Landmark Medical Literature, and, for over 20 years, directed the Internal Medicine Clerkship. With Scott Stern and Diane Altkorn he authored the textbook, Symptom to Diagnosis: An Evidence Based Guide. This book, originally published in 2006 is currently in its 4th edition. The book teaches an evidence-based, step-by-step process for evaluating, diagnosing, and treating patients based on their clinical complaints. Doody's Review stated that this book is "useful as a refresher for established clinicians when the more common diagnoses are not the cause of a patient's complaints." Cifu and Stern hosted the podcast S2D: The Symptom to Diagnosis Podcast in which they shared a case and diagnosis based on each chapter in the book. He now hosts The Clinical Excellence Podcast which is dedicated to various facets of the physician/patient relationship.

Health humanities
Cifu has published many health humanities essays in medical journals on topics such as the death of his patients, the changes in a physician's practice over time, and the variability of practice quality from day to day. His most highly viewed article is advice to students starting medical school. Beginning he 2022 he publishes biweekly essays on the Sensible Medicine substack.

Bibliography

Books
Symptom to Diagnosis: An Evidence Based Guide, Fourth Edition (2019) ISBN 9781260121124
Ending Medical Reversal: Improving Outcomes, Saving Lives (2019) ISBN 9781421429045

Selected articles
Prasad, V., Gall, V., & Cifu, A. (2011). The frequency of medical reversal. Archives of internal medicine, 171(18), 1675–1676.
Prasad, V., Cifu, A., & Ioannidis, J. P. (2012). Reversals of established medical practices: evidence to abandon ship. Jama, 307(1), 37–38.
Prasad, V., Vandross, A., Toomey, C., Cheung, M., Rho, J., Quinn, S., ... & Cifu, A. (2013, August). A decade of reversal: an analysis of 146 contradicted medical practices. In Mayo Clinic Proceedings (Vol. 88, No. 8, pp. 790–798). Elsevier.
Cifu, A. S., & Davis, A. M. (2017). Prevention, detection, evaluation, and management of high blood pressure in adults. Jama, 318(21), 2132–2134.

References 

American physicians
Haverford College alumni
Weill Cornell Medical College alumni
University of Chicago faculty

Living people

Year of birth missing (living people)
American medical academics